Lieutenant-general Sir Charles Stuart,  (January 1753–25 May 1801), was a British nobleman and soldier. The fourth son of John Stuart, 3rd Earl of Bute, and Mary Wortley Montagu, he was born in Kenwood House, London. There is a famous painting in the Tate Gallery, London, of him aged 10 stealing eggs and chicks from a bird's nest.

He had several notable brothers and sisters, including John Stuart, 1st Marquess of Bute (1744–1814); The Most Rev. and Hon. William Stuart (1755–1822), a clergyman who became Archbishop of Armagh, and James Archibald Stuart (1747–1818), another soldier who raised the 92nd Foot in 1779. His sisters were Lady Louisa Stuart (1757–1851), a writer who died unmarried, Lady Mary Stuart (c. 1741–1824), who married James Lowther, later the 1st Earl of Lonsdale; Lady Anne Stuart (born c. 1745), who married Lord Warkworth, later the 2nd Duke of Northumberland; Lady Jane Stuart (c. 1748–1828), who married George Macartney, later the first Earl Macartney; and Lady Caroline Stuart (b. 1763–1813), who married The Hon. John Dawson, later first Earl of Portarlington.

Military career

Early career
Stuart embarked upon a military career in 1768, when he enlisted as an ensign in the 37th Regiment of Foot. He purchased a lieutenancy in the 7th Regiment of Foot (Royal Fusiliers) in 1770 and a captaincy in the 35th Foot in 1773. In October of that year, he became a major in the 43rd Regiment of Foot, and saw service in the American War of Independence. In October 1777, he was commissioned as a lieutenant-colonel of the 26th Regiment of Foot, which he commanded until 1779.

On a visit home to England, he married Anne Louisa Bertie, daughter of Lord Vere Bertie, on 19 April 1778. He returned briefly to America, before coming back to London as a liaison to the ministry. A harsh critic of the Army's conduct, he was, however, highly favored by Sir Henry Clinton, with whom he corresponded regularly. His two sons were born after his return from America:
Charles Stuart, 1st Baron Stuart de Rothesay (2 January 1779–6 November 1845)
Captain John James Stuart (29 August 1782–19 March 1811), died aboard his command, the frigate . John James's son Charles Stuart (1810–1892) was British Army general and MP.

He was promoted to colonel in 1782, but his criticisms and the disfavor of George III towards his father prevented further military commands. He had been elected MP for Bossiney in 1776, succeeding his elder brother Lord Mount Stuart, who had been created Baron Cardiff. Stuart continued an MP for the remainder of his life, except the years 1794–1796, but showed little interest in politics. In 1792, on the death of his father, he inherited the estate of Highcliffe House in Hampshire.

With the opening of hostilities against France by the First Coalition, he returned to active service. On 23 May 1794, he took command of the army in Corsica, and supervised the taking of Calvi (the action in which Horatio Nelson lost an eye). Colonel John Moore was at the time his adjutant general. Stuart was promoted to lieutenant-general for this action, and on 24 October 1794, was made colonel of the 68th Regiment of Foot. However, his pride and violent temper led him to quarrel with Lord Hood, commanding the Mediterranean Fleet, and with the civilian viceroy of Corsica, Sir Gilbert Elliot, Bt. His partiality for Pasquale Paoli against Elliot, and other conflicts, led Stuart to resign in February 1795. On 25 March 1795, he left the colonelcy of the 68th for that of the 26th Regiment of Foot, which he held for the remainder of his life.

Defence of Portugal
He took command of a force sent to Portugal in January 1797 to defend Lisbon, and was notably successful in instilling discipline and spirit into the force, which was partly foreign in composition.

Capture of Menorca

In 1798, he was sent to attack Menorca (historically called "Minorca" by the British) with 3,000 men, an appointment heartily approved by Lord St Vincent, who praised Stuart as an excellent general and inspiring leader of troops. Though unequipped with siege artillery, he successfully dissimulated and bluffed the Spaniards into surrendering the island without loss of life, an exploit for which he was made a Knight of the Bath. From 15 November 1798 until 1800, he served as the British governor of the island. In March 1799, he responded to an appeal by Admiral Nelson (who, like St Vincent, thought him an excellent leader), and brought the 30th and 89th Regiments under Colonel Blayney to Palermo, from whence they were dispatched to secure Messina against French invasion.

Death and memorials
In April 1800 he resigned as governor of Menorca and returned to England. He was then offered the post of Commander-in-Chief, Ireland, but died at his home in Richmond Park on 25 March 1801 before he could accept. He was buried in the family vault at St Peter's Church, Petersham. There are monuments to Stuart in Westminster Abbey, this by Joseph Nollekens, and in St Peter's Church.

An able general and administrator, Stuart's quarrelsome disposition and tendency toward insubordination blighted an otherwise promising military career.

References

1753 births
1801 deaths
People from Hampstead
British Army generals
British Army personnel of the American Revolutionary War
British Army personnel of the French Revolutionary Wars
Knights Companion of the Order of the Bath
Members of the Parliament of Great Britain for English constituencies
Children of prime ministers of the United Kingdom
Younger sons of earls
Younger sons of barons
37th Regiment of Foot officers
68th Regiment of Foot officers
Royal Fusiliers officers
Cameronians officers
Members of the Parliament of Great Britain for constituencies in Cornwall
Charles
Members of the Parliament of Great Britain for Scottish constituencies
Members of the Parliament of the United Kingdom for English constituencies
British MPs 1774–1780
British MPs 1780–1784
British MPs 1784–1790
British MPs 1790–1796
British MPs 1796–1800
UK MPs 1801–1802
Burials at St Peter's, Petersham